Brynmor Jones may refer to:
 David Brynmor Jones (1851–1921), British MP
 Brynmor Jones (academic) (1903–1989), chemist, researcher into liquid crystals and vice-chancellor of the University of Hull